Seal Island is an island of Namibia. It is located in Lüderitz Bay, north of Penguin Island and west of Agate Beach.

References 

Islands of Namibia
Islands of the South Atlantic Ocean